The GP32 (GamePark 32) is a handheld game console developed by the South Korean company Game Park. It was released on November 23, 2001, in South Korea and distributed in some parts of Europe.

History
The GP32 was shown at E3 in 1999, 2000, 2001, and 2002. At one point GamePark produced an unreleased unit with mobile phone functionality.

Features
The overall design is not unlike the original version of the Game Boy Advance. The GP32 is based on a 133 MHz ARM 9 CPU and 8 MB of SDRAM. Unlike other handheld gaming systems, which tend to be proprietary cartridge-based, the GP32 uses SmartMedia cards (SMC) for storing programs and data, making it accessible for amateur developers as no further development hardware is required.

The console has an eight-way microswitch based mini-joystick controller, two main buttons ('A' and 'B'), two shoulder buttons on each side of the SMC slot ('L' and 'R') and two other menu buttons on each side of the screen ('SELECT' and 'START'), made from a softer, translucent rubber. The console also has a USB 1.1 port for connection with a host computer, a serial expansion port, a 3.3 V power adapter input, a headphone connector and a rear compartment that holds two AA-sized batteries.

Variants 
There are three main commercial versions of the unit characterized by different display types.  Commercial units are white in color with either grey or white buttons and trim. There are also a number of differently colored promotional units and several prototype units with different designs.

GP32 NLU 
The original GP32 was the no-light unit (NLU) which relied on an external light source to view the screen.

GP32 FLU 
In late 2002, Game Park introduced the frontlight unit (FLU) as a factory-modified (by Hahotech) version of the NLU. It provides its own illumination via a transparent panel between the LCD display and the plastic screen cover. The extra hardware resulted in a slightly raised display frame when compared to the NLU and BLU variants. The front light could be turned off with a switch mounted on the back of the GP32 case (to save battery).
The GP32 FLU's name was derived from a sticker added to the front of the GP32 packaging differentiating it from the standard non-light versions.

GP32 BLU 
In mid-2004, Game Park introduced the backlight unit (BLU). The new BLU LCD was compatible with the NLU (and FLU) and provided a superior screen display in poor lighting conditions. At the end of 2004, Game Park also released a second version of the BLU, which had a different LCD from the first version of BLU units. The new BLU+ LCD was not 100% compatible with the original LCD screen and so software required special handling to support both LCD versions.
The backlight could be disabled by holding the SELECT button for 5 seconds.  The BLU models also had a slightly different USB port connector and better quality micro switches for the controller.

BLU+ Compatibility

A backlit GP32 (released in December 2004) was given the name BLU+ by the community. The backlit unit featured a different LCD display (Taiwanese manufactured instead of Samsung), which led to some compatibility problems with certain applications, and problems such as white lines across the screen. However, nearly all applications were fixed once it was found that the new screens had better contrast than the old ones. The backlit GP32's were commercially named "BLU". The BLU+ was, as stated, a name that the community gave to notice the difference between the two models.

There were many applications that worked with the BLU+ and other models.
Mirko's SDK could autodetect which version one had. All the applications such as emulators, movie players, and the like worked as well on the BLU+, as on other models.

Software

Built In
The original Game Park firmware had three main functions: to launch applications, provide a means of linking to a host computer and play music in MP3 format.
Later versions of the Game Park firmware removed the MP3 music capability.

Homebrew
Game Park planned their system to be powerful and useful, but they also wanted users to be able to create homebrew software. GP32 users could register the unit on the official website and get a free suite of development tools to create their own programs. Game Park also allowed (under certain restrictions) the publishing of such homebrew games on their website.
The GP32's original firmware only supported running encrypted games and tools. Users had to register and use an encrypted "Free Launcher" to run unsigned software. Alternative firmware removed the necessity of using the "Free Launcher" software and provided many extra functions that were lacking in the original firmware.

Through this strategy, the GP32 was the host of multiple homebrew applications and games. The various applications made for it ranged from alternative firmware, file managers, games, emulators, game generators (such as RPG Maker), a DivX player and image slideshows.

Commercial
Commercial games could be acquired via internet download (encrypted to the GP32's ID) or in a retail box.  The retail boxes contained SmartMedia Cards with the games which were encrypted to run only from these cards (SMC ID). They could alternatively be downloaded from a Korean portal after submitting the GP32's ID, they were then encrypted to run only on that GP32. Downloading the games effectively reduced the cost to the consumer, who was no longer paying for the manufacture of the cartridge. Downloading a game online could range from US$10 to US$30.

Games

Five games in a variety of genres were released at the system's launch on November 23, 2001.  About 28 commercial games were eventually released.  The last commercial game to be released was the platformer/RPG Blue Angelo, which was released on December 16, 2004. Most commercial GP32 games could be bought in two ways: boxed or downloaded through the internet through Gamepark's online JoyGP store (typically for a much lower price). JoyGP was the international version of the MegaGP store, which existed earlier and was limited to South Korea. Although most games were sold in both formats, there were a few exceptions: for example, "Blue Angelo" was (and is) only sold as a boxed copy made in France, and "Gloop Deluxe" was only sold online, but not through JoyGP.

Although the number of official games available for the GP32 system is limited, many open source/free software developers worked on various emulators and ported PC games. In addition to this, a wide range of free, public domain games were created by amateur developers. Game Park did not ask any royalties to release games for its device, which made it easier for small editors or independent developers to release software for the GP32.

The modification of Ericsson Chatboard micro-keyboards to work with the system has seen a new flourish of software development, including countless attempts at ports of Linux, and keyboard support being added to many emulators.

Emulators
The GP32's relatively powerful ARM 920T CPU and freely available 'C'-based SDK have allowed many emulators to be specifically developed or ported from other platforms. Emulated systems that run on the GP32 include 16-bit era and earlier console and computer platforms. These emulators allow users to experience a large variety of games on their GP32 system, largely compensating for the relatively small library of commercially available games.
There is also a Windows-based GP32 emulator, which allows users to run GP32 software on a Windows-based PC.

Commercial availability
Commercially, the system can be found mostly in Korea, and some other parts of Asia. Although an initial European release was abandoned, the GP32 BLU model was released in three European markets, including Portugal, Spain, and Italy, being distributed by Virgin Play on June 15, 2004, with a price point of €199. There are official distributors in the United Kingdom and Sweden as well. Game Park, however, did not release the console in America. Since the GP32 is no longer in production, the console can commonly be found on eBay, forums, or other used video game vendors or websites.

Despite the GP32 not being released worldwide, it has a large international community of users and developers. About 32,000 or 30,000 units were sold by the end of 2007.

Hardware

Successors
 GP2X - dual-CPU unit produced by new company GamePark Holdings.
 GP2X Wiz - Successor to the GP2X
 GP2X Caanoo - Successor to the GP2X Wiz
 XGP - a never-released system developed by Game Park

See also
 Comparison of handheld game consoles

References

External links
 GP32 File Archive (all free software written for the system)
 

ARM-based video game consoles
Handheld game consoles
Sixth-generation video game consoles
Game Park